This is a list of business schools in Europe. This list should not include schools that teach business alongside other subjects; i.e. a university that has a business curriculum should not be listed here as a business school.  Those schools that have articles (i.e. are notable) are accepted for inclusion without a supporting citation; those schools that do not have articles (i.e. red-links) must have associated citations which reliable support the existence and focus of the school.
Triple accreditation in management education, also known as Triple Crown accreditation, is the combined business school accreditation of three major accreditation bodies: AACSB in the United States,  AMBA in the United Kingdom, and EQUIS in the European Union. More than 110 business schools worldwide, or about 1% of all business schools, are triple-accredited.

See also 
Lists of business school, other continents
 List of business schools in Africa
 List of business schools in Australia
 List of business schools in Asia
 List of business schools in the United States

References

 
Europe